Marcelo Estrada  (died 1 April 2002) was a Salvadoran football coach.

External links
Falleció Marcelo Estrada - El Diario de Hoy 

Year of birth missing
2002 deaths
People from La Libertad Department (El Salvador)
Salvadoran footballers
Salvadoran football managers
C.D. Luis Ángel Firpo managers

Association footballers not categorized by position